Area code 603 is the sole area code for the U.S. state of New Hampshire in the North American Numbering Plan (NANP). It was created as one of the original 86 numbering plan areas in October 1947.

In 2011, area code 603 was said to be nearing exhaustion and a second area code for New Hampshire was expected to be activated by 2013 as a statewide overlay plan. As a result of changes in allocation policies and a reclamation of a large block of previously allocated telephone numbers, including number pooling, the exhaustion time frame has been moved to at least 2032.

10-digit dialing 
Prior to October 2021, area code 603 had telephone numbers assigned for the central office code 988. In 2020, 988 was designated nationwide as a dialing code for the National Suicide Prevention Lifeline, which created a conflict for exchanges that permit seven-digit dialing. This area code was therefore scheduled to transition to ten-digit dialing by October 24, 2021.

Central office prefixes 
Unless otherwise stated, most of the prefixes were introduced on or before February 4, 1994. Prefixes located in Derry are also used in adjacent Londonderry. 976 is assigned to Concord, and requires dialling 1-603 first.

References

External links

 List of exchanges from AreaCodeDownload.com, 603 Area Code
 December 2010 newspaper article about then-uncertain future of 603

603
603
Telecommunications-related introductions in 1947